The 2015 women's road cycling season was the sixth for the , which began as the Dolmans Landscaping Team in 2010.

Sponsoring
For the 2015 season, both Specialized Bicycle Components and lululemon Athletica announced that they were ending their sponsorship of the already existing Specialized–lululemon team and switching their support to Boels–Dolmans for 2015.

Roster

On 27 October 2014 the team signed Amalie Dideriksen.

As of 1 January 2015. Ages as of 1 January 2015.

Riders who joined the team for the 2015 season

Riders who left the team during or after the 2014 season

Season

The team started the road cycling season with the Ladies Tour of Qatar. Ellen van Dijk won the second stage by sprinting away in the last kilometre from a group of six. With her victory she also took the lead in the general classification. The day afterwards Lizzie Armitstead won the stage and took over the leading jersey from Van Dijk. In the first European race of the season, the Omloop het Nieuwsblad, the team was again very strong and dominated the race. With 30 km to go van Dijk escaped together with Anna van der Breggen from a front group of 15 riders on the Molenberg. The duo extended their advantage over the cobbled sections that followed, holding off the chase group to the line, where Van Dijk lost the two-up sprint. Behind them Armitstead sprinted to the third place. At the 2015 Le Samyn des Dames Megan Guarnier was in a front group of six riders, but she expected not to win. In the final 4 kilometers after the last cobbled section Ellen van Dijk started chasing the front group at the head of the peloton and was able to close the gap. She also was a good lead-out for Chantal Blaak who won the peloton sprint.  In the first World Cup of the season, the Ronde van Drenthe the team was eager to win. Van Dijk was in the final the lead-out for Armitstead. However, Armitstead lost Van Dijk in the last kilometre. Van Dijk continued sprinting and rode to the third place. Van Dijk said afterwards that she was happy with her result, but found it a shame that the team did not win. In the second World Cup, the Trofeo Alfredo Binda was in the final Armitstead was part of the front group of six riders. Armitstead won the sprint, winning the first World Cup race for the team of the season.

Ellen van Dijk was selected to represent the Netherlands at the first 2015 European Games in the time trial and the road race in Baku, Azerbaijan in June. The time trial was her big goal and she was the favorite to win it. With a good race over the straight circuit she was 36 seconds faster than the Ukrainian Hanna Solovey and won the first gold medal for the Netherlands. In the road race she was part of front group of four riders, together with countrywomen Anna van der Breggen. During the last lap it appeared that Van der Breggen rode for her Polish  teammate Katarzyna Niewiadoma and not for the Netherlands. Van Dijk was the brunt of these tactics and finished fourth.

Season victories

UCI World Ranking

The 2015 UCI Women's Road Rankings are rankings based upon the results in all UCI-sanctioned races of the 2015 women's road cycling season.

Boels–Dolmans Cycling Team finished second in the 2015 ranking for UCI teams.

Notes

References

External links
 

2015 UCI Women's Teams seasons
2015 in Dutch sport
2015